Tamás Sifter (born 1 March 1983 in Sopron) is a Hungarian football player who currently plays for Soproni VSE.

References

External links
 Profile

1983 births
Living people
People from Sopron
Hungarian footballers
Association football midfielders
FC Sopron players
Fehérvár FC players
Paksi FC players
Soproni VSE players
Nemzeti Bajnokság I players
Sportspeople from Győr-Moson-Sopron County